Carlsen Island is one of the Rønnbeck Islands in the Svalbard archipelago. It lies southeast of Hinlopen Strait and northeast of Cape Weyprecht on Spitsbergen. There are also some islets to the north and east. The wildlife consists largely of polar bears.

The island is named after Elling Carlsen (1819–1900), a Norwegian skipper and seal hunter.

References

Islands of Svalbard
Seal hunting